Amethyst is a semi-precious form of quartz.

Amethyst or Améthyste may also refer to:

 Amethyst (color)

Fiction
 Amethyst, Princess of Gemworld, comics franchise
 Amethyst Van Der Troll, from Trollz animation series 
 Bewitching Smile Amethyst, an attribute of Shizuru Fujino in animation franchise My-Otome
 Amethyst (Steven Universe), a fictional character from Steven Universe

Ships 
 HMS Amethyst, various British warships 
 USS Amethyst (PYc-3), of the US (1940s)
 HMT Amethyst, a 1934 naval trawler
 Améthyste, Haitian warship, a.k.a. French frigate Félicité
 French submarine Améthyste (S605), a 1988 nuclear-powered submarine

Music
Adam and the Amethysts, Canadian band led by Adam Waito
Amethyst (Billy Hart album), 1993
 Amethyst (mixtape), a 2015 mixtape by Tinashe
 "Amethyst", single by The Awakening from The Fourth Seal of Zeen
 "Amethyst", song by Yoshiki
 "Amethyst", song by Fightstar from They Liked You Better When You Were Dead

Other uses
Amethyst (given name), the name
 Iggy Azalea (born Amethyst Amelia Kelly), Australian recording artist
 Amethyst Initiative, American activist organization
 Browallia americana, a plant also known as Amethyst flower
 Amethyst gasfield, a gas field in the UK
  Amethyst, a Russian anti-ship missile
 Brand name for a type of birth control that includes ethinylestradiol/levonorgestrel
 Amethyst (drag queen), American drag queen